Andrew Paulson (born 16 November 2001) is a Czech tennis player.

Paulson has a career high ATP singles ranking of 391 achieved on 22 August 2022. He also has a career high doubles ranking of 182 achieved on 19 September 2022.

Paulson has won 1 ATP Challenger doubles title at the 2022 IBG Prague Open with Victor Vlad Cornea.

Challenger and World Tennis Tour finals

Singles: 5 (4-1)

Doubles

References

External links
 
 

2001 births
Living people
Czech male tennis players
Tennis players from Prague
21st-century Czech people